Scaevola hookeri,  commonly known as the creeping fan-flower or alpine fan-flower,  is a species of flowering plant in the family Goodeniaceae. It has white or blue flowers with a yellow throat and grows in eastern Australia.

Description

Taxonomy and naming
Scaevola hookeri was first formally described in 1851 by W.H. de Vriese and the description was published in Nederlandsch Kruidkundig Archief and given the name Merkusia hookeri. The species was transferred to the genus Scaevola in 1856. The specific epithet (hookeri) is named in honour of Joseph Dalton Hooker.

Distribution and habitat
Creeping fan-flower grows in grassland and woodland in high altitude areas in Victoria, New South Wales, Tasmania, and also South Australia where it is listed as "endangered".

References

hookeri
Flora of New South Wales
Flora of South Australia
Flora of Tasmania
Flora of Victoria (Australia)
Asterales of Australia